Padatik (The Foot Soldier) first published in 1940 is a Bengali book of poems written by Subhash Mukhopadhyay. This was Mukhopadhyay's first published book. This book created a storm in Bengali literature. Mukhopadhyay wrote this book as a representative of a political party. Mukhopadhyay in his personal life was a consistent Marxist. In this book, poet showed his zeal to redeem the poor and suffering masses from exploitation.

Legacy
For the popularity of the book Subhash Mukhopadhyay is often called "Padatik Subhash Mukhopadhyay" or "Padatik poet Subhash Mukhopadhyay",
In 2009 Sealdah-NJP Express was named "Padatik Express" after this book in memory of the poet.

References

1940 poetry books
Bengali poetry
Indian poetry collections